Dorsett Wanchai Hong Kong Hotel (formerly Cosmopolitan Hotel Hong Kong) is a 454-room 4.5-star hotel located on 387–397 Queen's Road East, midway between Wan Chai and Causeway Bay while opposite of Happy Valley Racecourse in Hong Kong Island. The hotel has been recently awarded the TripAdvisor's Travellers’ Choice 2020. It is also a 2019 EarthCheck Silver Certified green hotel with 100% smoke-free guest floors.

The Dorsett Wanchai Hotel is one of the participating hotels of the membership program Dorsett-Your Rewards, which belongs to Dorsett Hospitality International.

History
The building was originally built to be a hotel, but bought by and formerly used by Xinhua News Agency Hong Kong Branch before it finished. After 1997, Xinhua News Agency Hong Kong Branch became the Liaison Office of the Central People's Government in the Hong Kong Special Administrative Region. After the liaison office moved to Sai Ying Pun in 2001, Far East Consortium International Limited took over the building and refurbished it as a hotel. The hotel, originally named Cosmopolitan Hotel Hong Kong, was renamed Dorsett Wanchai Hong Kong Hotel and renovated in 2016, as one of the hotels under Dorsett Hotels & Resorts of Dorsett Hospitality International.

References

External links

 Official website

Queen's Road East
Hotels in Hong Kong